Lichenodiplis is a genus of fungi with uncertain classification.

The genus was first described by Dyko and David Leslie Hawksworth in 1979.

The genus has cosmopolitan distribution.

Species:
 Lichenodiplis lecanorae (Vouaux) Dyko & D.Hawksw., 1979
 Lichenodiplis lichenicola Dyko & D.Hawksw., 1979
 Lichenodiplis pertusariicola

References

Pezizomycotina
Ascomycota genera
Taxa named by David Leslie Hawksworth
Taxa described in 1979